Zhang Junxiang  (December 27, 1910 – November 14, 1996) was a Chinese film director and playwright. Born in Zhenjiang in China's Jiangsu province, Zhang was educated first at Tsinghua University in Beijing, then at Yale University in the United States.

Zhang acted in the 1982 film Da ze long she, about an armed conflict between coal miners and management set in the 1920s. In addition to this he also wrote the 1954 war film Letter with Feather. In 1959, he was a member of the jury at the 1st Moscow International Film Festival.

Zhang died in Shanghai in 1996.

Selected filmography

As director

As screenwriter

References

External links

Chinese Movie Database - Zhang Junxiang

1910 births
1996 deaths
Writers from Zhenjiang
Film directors from Jiangsu
Screenwriters from Jiangsu
Chinese dramatists and playwrights
Tsinghua University alumni
People's Republic of China writers
20th-century Chinese dramatists and playwrights
20th-century screenwriters